= Joseph Steinberg (cybersecurity) =

American cybersecurity expert

Joseph Steinberg is a cybersecurity expert. He has written extensively and lectured on the subject and has also registered a number of patents in the area.

== Career ==
Steinberg served for a decade as CEO of cybersecurity firm, Green Armor Solutions, and for half-a-decade in various senior capacities at Whale Communications.

=== Lecturer ===
Steinberg lectures about cybersecurity at Columbia University.

=== Author ===
Steinberg wrote a column for Forbes about the subject for a number of years. In addition to Forbes, Steinberg wrote for Venture Beat, Security Intelligence, Newsweek, and Inc Magazine. He wrote Cybersecurity for Dummies.

=== Cybersecurity expert ===
Steinberg is also called on as a cybersecurity expert to provide insight into events as they pertain to the niche.

== Board positions ==
Steinberg serves as a senior policy analyst at the Global Foundation for Cyber Studies and Research think tank.

== Personal life ==
Steinberg studied at NYU.
